The 2023 Zinox Laser F2000 Italian Formula Trophy is a planned multi-event open-wheel single seater motor racing championship. This will be the tenth season of the series, featuring a mix of professional and amateur drivers competing in different classes and using multiple kinds of Formula 3- and Formula Renault-level machinery. For the 2023 season, the title sponsor of the championship changed from TopJet to Zinox Laser.

The championship has a cooperation with the Drexler-Automotive Formula Cup, with the two series sharing grids and race slots on multiple race weekends.

Teams and drivers 
Teams and drivers competing in the F2000 Trophy are divided into four classes: Platinum, Gold, Silver and Bronze rank the field based on the cars' age and technical characteristics as well as the drivers' experience. For competition in the F2.0 Cup, the field is divided into Pro and Light entries.

F2000 Trophy entries

F2.0 Cup entries 
All drivers will compete driving Tatuus FR2.0 cars with Renault engines.

Race calendar 
The 2023 calendar was first announced on 21 January 2023.

References

External links 

 

F2000 Italy
F2000 Italy
F2000 Italy